A list of Empire ships that were of United States origin. See Lists of Empire ships for references.

4 Ships built prior to the establishment of the United States Shipping Board

 Chicago Shipbuilding Company
 Empire Newt (built 1903)
 American Shipbuilding Company, Cleveland Ohio
 Empire Stickleback (built 1895)
 Toledo Shipbuilding Company, Toledo, Ohio
 Empire Taj
 New York Shipbuilding, Camden, New Jersey
 Empire Woodlark (built 1913)

93 Ships built for the USSB, approximately between 1917 and 1920. The majority of these ships were of standard
designs of 7,500dwt, 8,800dwt, 9,400dwt and 9,600dwt. Plus 4 ships shortly after the USSB reign.

 Skinner & Eddy, Seattle, Washington
 Empire Buffalo
 Empire Bunting
 Empire Cheetah
 Empire Dunlin
 Empire Gull(I)
 Empire Hartebeeste
 Empire Ibex
 Empire Leopard
 Empire Mermaid
 Empire Pelican
 Empire Penguin
 Empire Simba
 Empire Wildebeeste
 Ames Shipbuilding and Drydock Company, Seattle, Washington
 Empire Chamois
 Empire Eagle
 Empire Gemsbuck
 Empire Kittiwake (I)
 Empire Merlin
 Empire Nightingale
 Empire Ocelot
 Empire Springbuck
 Empire Woodcock
 American International Shipbuilding, Hog Island, Pennsylvania
 Empire Barracuda
 Empire Dolphin
 Empire Falcon
 Empire Flamingo
 Empire Hawk
 Empire Mahseer
 Empire Ortolan
 Empire Razorbill
 Empire Shearwater
 Empire State, launched as Shaume was not an Empire ship.
 Federal Shipbuilding and Drydock Company, Kearny, New Jersey
 Empire Kangaroo
 Empire Kudu
 Empire Magpie
 Empire Peacock
 Empire Redshank
 Empire Reindeer
 Empire Thrush
 Empire Toucan (1920, but not for the USSB)
 Empire Whale
 Moore Dry Dock Company, Oakland, California
 Empire Avocet
 Empire Heron
 Empire Merganser
 Empire Plover
 Empire Raven
 Empire Starling
 Empire Whimbrel
 Todd Dry Dock and Construction Company, Tacoma, Washington
 Empire Antelope
 Empire Elk
 Empire Gazelle
 Empire Mallard
 Empire Tiger
 Empire Wagtail
 Columbia River Shipbuilding, Portland, Oregon
 Empire Miniver
 Empire Moorhen
 Empire Oryx, later Empire Robin
 Empire Panther
 Empire Turnstone
 Northwest Steel, Portland, Oregon
 Empire Cormorant
 Empire Cougar
 Empire Grebe (I)
 Empire Mavis
 Empire Opossum
 G. M. Standifer Construction, Vancouver, Washington
 Empire Kingfisher
 Empire Ptarmigan
 Empire Sambar, later Empire Beaver
 Merchant Shipbuilding Corporation, Chester, Pennsylvania
 Empire Kite, later Empire Seal (1922, not for USSB)
 Empire Lapwing (Bristol yard)
 Empire Swan (1922, not for USSB, sister ship of Kite, both early motor ship designs)
 Southwestern Shipbuilding, San Pedro, California
 Empire Bison
 Empire Hawksbill
 Atlantic Corporation, Portsmouth, New Hampshire
 Empire Dabchick
 Empire Dorado
 J. F. Duthie & Company, Seattle, Washington
 Empire Adur (1920, not for the USSB)
 Empire Gannet (I)
 Virginia Shipbuilding Corporation, Alexandria Virginia
 Empire Impala
 Empire Moose
 Pusey & Jones, Gloucester, New Jersey
 Empire Puma
 Empire Steelhead
 various others (1 ship per yard)
 Empire Bascobel (tug)
 Empire Caribou
 Empire Albatross
 Empire Crossbill
 Empire Egret
 Empire Eland
 Empire Guillemot (I)
 Empire Hamble
 Empire Kestrel
 Empire Lynx
 Empire Mouflon
 Empire Otter
 Empire Porpoise
 Empire Prize
 Empire Snipe
 Empire Tarpon
 Empire Tern (I)
 Empire Waterhen

21 Ships built for the United States Maritime Commission, approximately after 1939

 Consolidated Steel Corporation, Wilmington, California (C1-S-AY1)
 Empire Anvil
 Empire Arquebus
 Empire Battleaxe
 Empire Broadsword
 Empire Crossbow
 Empire Cutlass
 Empire Gauntlet
 Empire Halberd
 Empire Javelin
 Empire Lance
 Empire Mace
 Empire Rapier
 Empire Spearhead
 Federal Shipbuilding and Drydock Company, Kearny, New Jersey
 Empire Condor (I)
 Empire Fulmar (I)
 Empire Pintail
 Sun Shipbuilding and Drydock Company, Chester, Pennsylvania
 Empire Lagan
 Empire Peregrine
 Bethlehem Fore River Shipyard, Quincy, Massachusetts
 Empire Widgeon
 Bath Iron Works, Bath, Maine
 Empire Oriole
 Bethlehem Sparrows Point, Sparrows Point, Maryland
 Empire Curlew (I)

Empire ships built in the United States